A total solar eclipse occurred on July 20, 1963. A solar eclipse occurs when the Moon passes between Earth and the Sun, thereby totally or partly obscuring the image of the Sun for a viewer on Earth. A total solar eclipse occurs when the Moon's apparent diameter is at least the same size as the Sun's or larger, blocking all direct sunlight, turning day into darkness. Totality occurs in a narrow path across Earth's surface, with a partial solar eclipse visible over the surrounding region thousands of kilometres wide. Totality was visible from Hokkaido in Japan and Kuril Islands in Soviet Union (now belonging to Russia) on July 21, and Alaska, and Maine in the United States and also Canada on July 20. Astronomer Charles H. Smiley observed the eclipse from a U.S. Air Force F-104D Starfighter supersonic aircraft that was "racing the moon's shadow" at  extending the duration of totality to 4 minutes 3 seconds. The moon was 375,819 km (233,523 mi) from the Earth.

The moon's apparent diameter was 4.8 arcseconds smaller than the January 25, 1963 annular solar eclipse. This was a total solar eclipse because it occurred in July when the earth is near aphelion (furthest from the Sun). The moon's apparent diameter was just over 2.2% larger than the Sun's.

Occurring about 4.1 days after perigee (Perigee on July 16, 1963), the Moon's apparent diameter was larger.

In popular culture 
The eclipse was featured in the comic strip Peanuts (July 15–20, 1963), with Linus demonstrating a safe way of observing the eclipse as opposed to looking directly at the eclipse. On the day the eclipse passed over his area, Linus was left helplessly standing in the rain with cloud cover entirely too thick to witness the eclipse.

This particular eclipse event plays an important part in two of Stephen King's novels, Gerald's Game (1992) and Dolores Claiborne (1992).

The eclipse is mentioned in passing in John Updike' s novel Couples (1968) in relation to Piet and Foxy. 

The eclipse was featured in the season 3 episode of Mad Men entitled "Seven Twenty Three" (2009, S03E07).

Related eclipses

Tzolkinex 
 Preceded: Solar eclipse of June 8, 1956

 Followed: Solar eclipse of August 31, 1970

Sar (Half-Saros), Lunar Saros 138 
 Preceded: Lunar eclipse of July 16, 1954

 Followed: Lunar eclipse of July 26, 1972

Tritos 
 Preceded: Solar eclipse of August 20, 1952

 Followed: Solar eclipse of June 20, 1974

Solar Saros 145 
 Preceded: Solar eclipse of July 9, 1945

 Followed: Solar eclipse of July 31, 1981

Inex 
 Preceded: Solar eclipse of August 10, 1934

 Followed: Solar eclipse of June 30, 1992

Solar eclipses of 1961–1964

Saros 145

Inex series 

In the 19th century:
 Solar saros 140: total solar eclipse of October 29, 1818
 Solar saros 141: annular solar eclipse of October 9, 1847
 Solar saros 142: total solar eclipse of September 17, 1876

In the 22nd century:
 Solar saros 150: partial solar eclipse of April 11, 2108
 Solar saros 151: annular solar eclipse of March 21, 2137
 Solar saros 152: total solar eclipse of March 2, 2166
 Solar saros 153: annular solar eclipse of February 10, 2195

Metonic series

Notes

References

1963 07 20
1963 in science
1963 07 20
July 1963 events